Shams ad-Din Abi Abdillah Muhammad bin Ahmad bin Abd al-Hadi al-Maqdisi al-Hanbali better known as Ibn Abd al-Hadi (Damascus, 1305 (AH 705) - 1343 (AH 744)) was a Hanbali Islamic Muhaddith scholar from the Levant. He was a student of Ibn Taymiyyah. He is not to be confused with another Ibn ʿAbd al-Hādī from the same family, Yusuf bin Abdul Hadi (d. ).

References

External links 
 Book list from Goodread

1305 births
1343 deaths
Hanbalis
Hadith scholars
People from Damascus
Syrian Muslim scholars of Islam
14th-century jurists